Corredor is a surname. Notable people with the surname include:

Beatriz Corredor (born 1968), Spanish lawyer and politician, Minister of Housing 2008 to 2010
Diego Guerrero Corredor (born 1986), Venezuelan international footballer
Edgar Corredor (born 1960), Colombian former professional racing cyclist
Israel Corredor (born 1959), Colombian former professional racing cyclist
Josep Maria Corredor i Pomés (1912–1981), Catalan writer, translator, teacher and cultural activist
Maritza Corredor (born 1969), former road cyclist from Colombia
Monte Ibérico-Corredor de Almansa, comarca of the Province of Albacete, Spain
Oscar Cortes Corredor, retired Colombian football player
Pedro Ruíz Corredor, Spanish conquistador
Victor Corredor or Víctor Niño (born 1973), Colombian professional racing cyclist

See also
Finca Corredor, town in the Chiriquí province of Panama
Santuari del Corredor (Shrine of the Corredor) is a 16th-century hermitage within the municipality of Dosrius, Spain
Corredor Duarte or DR-1, dual carriageway highway, part of the five designated national highways of the Dominican Republic
Corredor Biologico Mesoamericano (Mesoamerican Biological Corridor) consists of several Central American countries
Corredor Logistico Integrado do Norte (Integrated Northern Logistical Corridor), a railway joint venture in Mozambique
Corredor Polonês (Portuguese for Polish Corridor) studio album by Brazilian post-punk/experimental rock band Patife Band
Corredor Público, legal professional in Mexico with specific functions in the field of commerce
Border Corridor Wildlife Refuge, wildlife refuge in the northern part of Costa Rica along the border with Nicaragua
Corredor Tijuana-Rosarito 2000, a freeway in northwestern Baja California connecting the Mesa de Otay area with Rosarito Beach